Dr. Luis Rafael Sánchez, a.k.a. "Wico" Sánchez (November 17, 1936) is a Puerto Rican essayist, novelist, and short-story author who is widely considered one of the island's most outstanding contemporary playwrights. Possibly his best known play is La Pasión según Antígona Pérez (The Passion according to Antigona Perez), a tragedy based on the life of Olga Viscal Garriga.

Early years
Sánchez was born and raised by his parents in the city of Humacao, Puerto Rico, in the eastern part of Puerto Rico. There he received his primary education. His family moved to San Juan, where Sánchez continued to receive his secondary and higher education. He enrolled in the University of Puerto Rico in 1955 after graduating from high school, earning a Bachelor of Arts degree. It was during his days as a student at the university that he became interested in acting.

Sánchez's interest in literature led him to enroll at the City University of New York where in 1959 he earned his master's degree in dramatic arts. He eventually went to Madrid, Spain and earned his Doctorate in Literature in 1976 from the Complutense University of Madrid.

La Pasión según Antigona Pérez

Sánchez's best known play is La Pasión según Antigona Pérez (The Passion of Antigona Perez), a tragedy set in present-day Latin America, suggested by Sophocles' Antigone. The character of Antigona was based on the life of Olga Viscal Garriga (1926–1995). Her life was rooted in politics and her three children. She was a member of the Puerto Rican Nationalist Party and an accomplished speaker who spent time in jail for her political beliefs yet, she saw herself as a simple woman with simple needs. But, in fact, she was a very complex woman with many facets of her personality. The world premiere production took place in 1968 at Old San Juan's Tapia Theater, starring Myrna Vázquez as "Antigona", during the 11th Annual Puerto Rican Theater Festival.

A highly acclaimed all-star revival opened in 1991 at San Juan's Performing Arts Center featuring Alba Nydia Diaz as Antigona, Walter Rodriguez as Creon, Samuel Molina as Monsignor Escudero, Marian Pabon as Pilar Vargas, Noelia Crespo as Aurora, and Julia Thompson as Irene. The production, which integrated video and broadcast technology, was directed by Idalia Perez Garay for Teatro del Sesenta Theater Company. It featured original music by Pedro Rivera Toledo, sets by Checo Cuevas, and film sequences supervised by Puerto Rican filmmaker Luis Molina Casanova. A new production opened at San Juan's Performing Arts Center on April 8, 2011, featuring Yamaris Latorre as Antigona, directed by Gilberto Valenzuela for Tablado Puertorriqueño Theater Company.

La Guaracha del Macho Camacho (Macho Camacho's Beat)
La Guaracha del Macho Camacho (Macho Camacho's Beat) was published in 1976. This novel moves to a guaracha, a Latin rhythm, inviting readers to imagine (or learn) what this beat sounds like. It has been suggested that the song itself is the real protagonist of the tale. The Americanization of Puerto Rico is explored in this work, as well as the topic of Puerto Rican politics and the political situation of the island as a colony. One aspect of this examination can be seen as a critique of Puerto Ricans who give up their culture to assimilate into the American culture as compared to Puerto Ricans who refuse to let go of their cultural identity. The book was translated into English by Gregory Rabassa.

In his essay "La guagua aérea" ("The Flying Bus"), Sánchez explores the concept of a bi-polar culture, the question of assimilation and opposition to U.S. Anglo culture. He coined the term "La guagua aérea" which has since been used by other prominent Puerto Rican authors such as Giannina Braschi who pays homage to Sánchez's classic essay in her Spanglish novel "Yo-Yo Boing!".  He also wrote En cuerpo de camisa ("In Shirt Sleeves", 1966), a collection of short stories.

Luis Rafael Sánchez is now a professor emeritus at the University of Puerto Rico and the City University of New York. He travels to Europe and Latin America, where he has been involved in the teachings and works of theater.

Other major works

 Los ángeles se han fatigado (play, 1960)
 Farsa del amor compradito (play, 1960)
 La hiel nuestra de cada día (play, 1960)
 Sol 13, interior (play, 1961)
 O casi el alma (play, 1965)
 En cuerpo de camisa (short story collection, 1966)
 Quíntuples (play, 1985)
 La importancia de llamarse Daniel Santos (novel, 1988)
 No llores por nosotros Puerto Rico (essay collection, 1998)
 Indiscreciones de un perro gringo (novel, 2007)

Further reading
Barradas, Efraín. Para leer en puertorriqueño. Río Piedras: Editorial Cultural, 1981. (In Order to Read in Puerto Rican).
Birmingham-Pokorny, Elba D. Ed. The Demythologization of Language, Gender, and Culture and the Re-Mapping of Latin American Identity in Luis Rafael Sanchez's Works. Miami: Ediciones Universal, 1999.
Colón Zayas, Eliseo. El Teatro de Luis Rafael Sánchez: Códigos, ideología y lenguaje. Madrid: Playor, 1985. (The Theater of Luis Rafael Sánchez).
Dalleo, Raphael. "Cultural Studies and the Commodified Public: Luis Rafael Sanchez's La guaracha del Macho Camacho and Earl Lovelace's The Dragon Can't Dance." Caribbean Literature and the Public Sphere: From the Plantation to the Postcolonial. Charlottesville: University of Virginia Press, 2011.
Figueroa, Alvin Joaquín. La prosa de Luis Rafael Sánchez: texto y contexto. New York: Peter Lang, 1989. (The Narrative Work of Luis Rafael Sánchez).
Gonzalez, Christopher Thomas. Hospitable Imaginations: Contemporary Latino/a Literature and the Pursuit of a Readership (The narrative works of Luis Rafael Sánchez, Junot Diaz, Giannina Braschi), Ohio State University, 2012.
Maeseneer, Rita De and Salvador Mercado Rodríguez. Ocho veces Luis Rafael Sánchez. Madrid: Editorial Verbum, 2008. (Eight essays about Sánchez's narrative.)
Mejías López, William. A lomo de tigre: Homenaje a Luis Rafael Sánchez. Ed. Introduction by Ramón Luis Acevedo. San Juan: Editorial de la Universidad de Puerto Rico, 2015.
Mercado Rodríguez, Salvador. Novelas bolero: ficciones musicalizadas posnacionales. San Juan: Isla Negra, 2012. (Bolero Novels: postnational musicalized fictions; has a chapter on Sánchez.)
Nouhaud, Dorita. Luis Rafael Sánchez: dramaturge, romancier et essayiste porto-ricain. Paris: L'Harmattan, 2001. 
Perivolaris, John Dimitri. Puerto Rican Cultural Identity and the Work of Luis Rafael Sánchez. Chapel Hill: U.N.C. Department of Romance Languages, 2000.
Stanchich, Maritza. Insular interventions: Diasporic Puerto Rican Literature Bilanguaging Toward a Greater Puerto Rico (on Luis Rafael Sánchez, Luis Palés Matos, Giannina Braschi), University of California, Santa Cruz, 2003.
Torres-Padilla, Jose L. and Carmen Haydes. Eds. Writing Off the Hyphen: New Critical Perspectives on the Puerto Rican Diaspora (Luis Rafael Sánchez, Giannina Braschi). With essay by Maritza Stanchich. University of Washington Press, 2008.
Vázquez Arce, Carmen. Por la vereda tropical: notas sobre la cuentística de Luis Rafael Sánchez. Buenos Aires: Ediciones de la Flor, 1994. (On the tropical lane [phrase taken from a song]: notes on Luis Rafael Sánchez's short story art.)
Waldman, Gloria. Luis Rafael Sánchez: pasión teatral. San Juan: Instituto de Cultura Puertorriqueña, 1988. (Luis Rafael Sánchez: Theatrical Passion).

See also

List of Puerto Rican writers
List of Puerto Ricans
Puerto Rican literature
Latino Theater in the United States

References

External links
Literature Map
 "Spanglish is everywhere now, which is no problema for some, but a pain in the cuello for purists: on Luis Rafael Sánchez, Giannina Braschi, Ana Lydia Vega," by Ilan Stavans, Boston Globe, 2003. 
"Interview with Luis Rafael Sánchez" in Sargasso, a journal of literature, language, and culture, which is fully online in the Digital Library of the Caribbean from the University of Puerto Rico

1936 births
Living people
People from Humacao, Puerto Rico
Puerto Rican dramatists and playwrights
Puerto Rican male writers
Complutense University of Madrid alumni
City College of New York alumni
University of Puerto Rico alumni
Puerto Rican novelists